Hurricane Cosme was an unusually large tropical cyclone that made landfall in south-western Mexico in June 1989. The third tropical storm and second hurricane of the 1989 Pacific hurricane season, Cosme formed on June 19 from a tropical wave, the storm initially moved westward before being upgraded into Tropical Storm Cosme. It ultimately intensifying into a Category 1 hurricane. Cosme turned northward and made landfall near Acapulco during the night of June 21. It rapidly weakened over land. The storm caused excessive rainfall on land, leading to deadly and destructive flooding. It is estimated that 30 people died in the hurricane.

Meteorological history

In early June 1989, a tropical wave emerged from the west coast of Africa and traversed the Atlantic Ocean, eventually crossing into the eastern North Pacific. Initially, several centers of circulation were associated with the system. Continuing organize, the storm is estimated to have attained tropical depression status at 0000 UTC on June 18. The depression was broad and lacked substantial thunderstorm activity. However, it did have respectable outflow and banding. It moved towards the west and intensified into a tropical storm at 0000 UTC on June 20, 48 hours after being classified.

Upon being named, Cosme meandered and remained nearly stationary as it continued to intensify. It became a hurricane midday UTC on June 21; this upgrade was delayed in real time. At this time, the hurricane accelerated towards the north. As the cyclone approached the coast of Mexico, it reached maximum sustained winds of 85 mph (140 km/h) and a minimum barometric pressure of 979 millibars.

During the night of June 21, Cosme made landfall just east of Acapulco. It moved inland and quickly deteriorated, weakening into a tropical storm shortly after coming ashore. It trekked northward through eastern Mexico and further diminished into a tropical depression before becoming indistinguishable south of Brownsville, Texas on June 23. Tropical Storm Allison's development in the Gulf of Mexico was partially related to residual conditions from Cosme's remnants.

Preparations and impact

Prior to the hurricane's landfall, Mexican officials evacuated nearly 260 people from low-lying areas near Acapulco. Ports in the region were also closed several days before the storm and remained closed for two days after as a precaution. In addition, flash flood watches and warnings were issued. Cosme brought heavy rains, which killed at least 30 people due to drowning. Many adobe homes were destroyed, but the specific cost of damage is unknown. High winds produced by the storm damaged numerous trees and power lines throughout the affected areas. Authorities in Acapulco stated that there were no major damage or injuries from the storm, with only one hotel sustaining minor damage.

See also

Other storms of the same name
1989 Atlantic hurricane season
List of Pacific hurricanes

References

External links

Hurricane Cosme storm wallet

Cosme (1989)
Cosme
Cosme (1989)
Cosme